The 2009 Giro d'Italia began on 9 May, with Stage 11 occurring on 20 May. The first stage, like it had been since 2007, was a team time trial, a stage where each member of the team raced together against the clock. Like most cycling Grand Tours do, the beginning of the 2009 Giro included a string of flat stages that were contested by sprinters. These stages were contested by Alessandro Petacchi and Mark Cavendish, among others, with Petacchi in victory becoming one of the only riders to defeat Cavendish in a sprint in the 2009 season.

At the end of the race's first week and beginning of its second were three hilly medium-mountain stages. These stages took the Giro through Austria and Switzerland before returning to Italy. Each of these stages took more than five hours to complete, and the rain that fell each day combined with the difficulties presented by the numerous ascents and descents made the courses potentially unsafe in the riders' opinion. This opinion was perhaps validated by the life-threatening injuries sustained by Pedro Horrillo in the eighth stage after he crashed while descending a mountain. While the ninth stage was meant to be a showy criterium in celebration of this being the 100th anniversary of the Giro d'Italia, the riders collectively protested the safety conditions of that stage and the ones before it. This meant it would be neutralized, with every rider receiving the same finishing time as the stage winner regardless of when they finished.

The tenth stage was the longest of this year's Giro, and one of its most mountainous. It, along with a stage later in the race, were both called the race's queen stage, its most difficult stage. Danilo Di Luca won this stage to pad his overall lead going into the second half of the Giro.

Stage 1

9 May 2009 — Lido (Venice),  (team time trial)

The 2009 Giro began, as it had since 2007, with a team time trial (TTT). The  ride over a perfectly flat course in Venice decided who would wear the first pink jersey.

 was the first team to ride the course, and wound up being the stage winners. They all finished together, which is relatively uncommon (especially for a winning team: only , which took the course nearly a minute slower, managed to also have all nine riders cross the finish line together). As the first  rider to cross the line, Mark Cavendish was awarded the first pink jersey as general classification (GC) leader; he was also awarded the white jersey as youth classification leader.

Stage 2
10 May 2009 — Jesolo to Trieste, 

This stage was very flat. It had only one categorized climb, at low elevation, near the end. This climb award the first points in the mountains classification and thus, the first green jersey awarded to its leader. The riders took three laps of an  finishing circuit in Trieste, with the points for the climb taken on their second time over the hill at Montebello.

Leonardo Scarselli was free of the main field for most of the stage after escaping early in the morning. David García won the climb in Trieste to become the first wearer of the green jersey, and Alessandro Petacchi won the group sprint to the line, narrowly edging out race leader Mark Cavendish.

A crash on the third pass over the Montebello hill meant the field was broken, with only 51 riders together for the sprint finish. The rest of the peloton finished 13 seconds back, and since this crash occurred outside  from the finish line, all time lost stood as lost. Notables among those who lost 13 seconds were Levi Leipheimer and Ivan Basso.

Stage 3
11 May 2009 — Grado to Valdobbiadene, 

This stage was also flat, and ended in a mass sprint.

A five rider breakaway, which had a maximum advantage of seven minutes, took the points at the one intermediate sprint and the one categorised climb of the day, but were caught with some  remaining.  A number of crashes occurred starting at the  remaining mark, and a series of attempted breaks meant that the peloton was fragmented, and Alessandro Petacchi took a second successive stage from a depleted group sprint.

The biggest victim of the repeated crashes was  leader Christian Vande Velde, who had to retire from the Giro with a broken rib and a hairline fracture of his pelvis. The crashes also made it so Mark Cavendish was not with the main peloton as it approached the finish line; he came to within 15 seconds of the group before abandoning the attempt to reach them, and essentially conceding the pink jersey. Petacchi's second straight stage win gave him the race leadership.

Stage 4
12 May 2009 — Padova to San Martino di Castrozza, 

A group of 6 riders escaped after just . This group comprised Serafín Martínez, Francesco Bellotti, Davide Viganò, Ian Stannard, Francesco De Bonis, and Jens Voigt. They attained a maximum advantage of six and a half minutes, and with a healthy pace of  through the stage's first three hours, it appeared possible that one of them would be the stage winner. The pace caught up with the group as they reached the foot of the day's final climb, and only Voigt and Bellotti remained together as the climb began. Two kilometers into the climb, Voigt attacked again and tried to solo to victory over the last .

The top GC men in the peloton and the specialist climbers formed a chase group that overhauled Voigt in the final . The attacks of Colombian climber Mauricio Soler had been responsible for driving this group to catch the remnants of the breakaway, and he attacked again in the final , quickly getting a gap over the competition and appearing poised for the stage win. As Soler had been the one who caused the crash that kept Mark Cavendish from potentially defending the pink jersey the day before, his combativeness on this stage was described as his "redemption". 2007 Giro d'Italia winner Danilo Di Luca timed his sprint to the line just right and overtook Soler for the victory. Sixteen riders finished with the same time as Di Luca, ten more were six seconds back, and a further 26 were inside a minute of his winning time. Thomas Lövkvist, who finished in the same group as Di Luca, took a narrow lead in the overall classification after the stage. However, Di Luca later tested positive for EPO and was stripped of his victory. The stage win was subsequently awarded to Stefano Garzelli, the runner-up.

Stage 5
13 May 2009 — San Martino di Castrozza to Alpe di Siusi, 

This was one of the shortest road race stages in the 2009 Giro, but its profile was quite unusual.

A seven-man breakaway was clear over the Passo Rolle climb and took a maximum lead of four and a half minutes in the valley between peaks. Giovanni Visconti was briefly race leader on the road, as he began the stage just under three minutes behind pink jersey wearer Thomas Lövkvist in the General Classification. The peloton, paced by Liquigas, caught them without about  left to race, leading the way for Sylwester Szmyd and then Ivan Basso to try to fracture the field before the finish. Six riders were able to keep his pace to the finish, with Denis Menchov the first to Alpe di Suisi for the stage win. The other six in the leading group kept close to the stage winner, with only Carlos Sastre losing more than ten seconds. Danilo Di Luca became the new race leader after his second place on the stage.

Damiano Cunego, Lance Armstrong and Stefano Garzelli, all of whom had been considered as possible favorites for overall victory in the Giro, all lost more than two minutes on this stage, being unable to take Liquigas' pace on the way up to Alpe di Suisi. As they, along with Michael Rogers, had shown weakness on the climb, one report named as the only remaining possibilities for Giro champion Menchov, Di Luca, Lövkvist, Basso, Levi Leipheimer, and Sastre. The victory gave Menchov stage wins in all three Grand Tours for his career, and his team  its first ever Giro d'Italia stage win.

Stage 6
14 May 2009 — Brixen to Mayrhofen (Austria), 

This stage was one of the longest in the 2009 Giro. The first half of the stage was undulating, without a categorized climb. The second half featured two short climbs with a flat  valley in between them. The descent from the second climb, Gerlospass, left a flat  to race before the finish in Austria.

The day's breakaway comprised five riders, and it formed after  in the saddle. Their maximum advantage was just under eight minutes. Scarponi dropped Kiryienka  later and went it alone for the stage win. The pink jersey group absorbed all the other members of the morning breakaway and finished half a minute behind Scarponi, with six from that group gaining four seconds on race leader Danilo Di Luca at the finish. Lance Armstrong lost even more time, finishing 43 seconds behind second place man Edvald Boasson Hagen.

Stage 7
15 May 2009 — Innsbruck (Austria) to Chiavenna, 

The race returned to Italy, after also passing through Switzerland, in another long stage. The one climb of the day occurred a little over  into the stage, the Passo Maloja. The entire stage to that point was on a slight increase in elevation, while the finish was on a long and drastic descent into Chiavenna. Its profile made it seem an inviting stage for breakaway attempts.

This stage saw numerous breakaways get away and stay away for a time. The first of them comprised four riders, coming clear after . This group attained a maximum advantage of over nine minutes, but the peloton was able to catch them before the Passo Maloja. Right at the summit, Alessandro Bertolini attacked and came free for a time. He was able to lengthen his escape somewhat by descending the Passo Maloja in an extremely aerodynamic position, out of the saddle with all his weight over the handlebars. A crucial four-man break took place  from the finish line, with Bertolini able to stay with them as they caught him, making it a five-man leading group. Andriy Hryvko tried to make his way up to them after they were well away, but could not make it. Despite the presence of more experienced riders and riders noted as sprinters in the break, it was young Norwegian Edvald Boasson Hagen who made it to the line first.

Controversy had arisen before the Giro when it was revealed that many of 's sponsors in Kazakhstan had not paid their full obligations to the team, and that the riders had therefore not been paid their full salaries to that point in the season. In protest, the team wore new jerseys beginning with this stage, that had the names of those underpaying sponsors faded out to the point of being unreadable.

Stage 8
16 May 2009 — Morbegno to Bergamo, 

There were two categorized climbs on this course, including a fairly tall and steep one at Culmine di San Pietro after . However, the amount of flat racing after the descent suggested that the type of finish this stage would see was far from certain.

Their maximum advantage was just over four minutes as they neared the day's second climb, the Colle del Gallo. A group of GC favorites and domestiques from their teams were first over this climb, with race leader Danilo Di Luca not among them at first, almost a minute back. As the leading group seemed unwilling to work together, Di Luca was able to bridge the gap and make it to them.

This stage also saw a dramatic and life-threatening crash from Pedro Horrillo, on the Culmine di San Pietro. His bike skidded on wet leaves during the descent, causing him to lose control of his machine, slide into a guardrail, and tumble head over heels down the mountainside. Horrillo fell  and sustained fractures to his thighbones, kneecaps, and T12 and C3 vertebrae, as well as a punctured lung and internal bleeding. He was airlifted off the mountain and was then taken by ambulance to a nearby hospital. Horrillo woke up in the ambulance, but was put in a chemically induced coma to aid his treatment. He was taken out of the coma the next day, with scans revealing no brain damage. The peloton's protest of Stage 9 the next day was largely in reaction to Horrillo's serious injury.

After spending some five weeks in hospitals both in Italy and his native Spain, Horrillo eventually recovered.

Stage 9
17 May 2009 — Milan,  (Milano Show 100)

This stage was a circuit race. The field took 10 laps of a  course in Milan (there was a  run-in before the circuits began). The course was flat, and the stage figured to be a major sprinters' battle.

The character of this stage changed drastically after the dramatic injury sustained by Pedro Horrillo the day before brought attention to safety conditions on this and other courses in the Giro. With the course passing over numerous different surfaces, including tram tracks and cobblestones, the peloton collectively protested racing this course, and as such it was neutralized, with everyone receiving the same time as the stage winner and no points were awarded for the points classification as had been planned. There were also parked cars at the side of the road in many places, forcing the riders into narrow tunnels to get through them.

Originally, the result of the riders' protest was only that the stage times would not count.  The peloton rode the first four laps very slowly, about  slower than previous stages, and at the end of the fourth lap, the race stopped altogether as race leader Danilo Di Luca took a microphone to address the crowd and explain why they were riding so slowly. Lance Armstrong, who along with Di Luca had been considered the voice of the peloton in the protest, apologized to the fans for the effect it had on what was supposed to be a grand spectacle, but also contended that it was the correct decision for the peloton to make.

The pace did eventually pick up, on the last lap, and the finish was contested in a bunched sprint, won by Mark Cavendish.

Stage 10
19 May 2009 — Cuneo to Pinerolo, 

After the rest day, the riders were faced with the Giro's longest stage, with numerous high mountain climbs along the course and the distinction of being the race's queen stage. It was originally scheduled to include the Col d'Izoard, which has been featured numerous times in the Tour de France as an hors catégorie climb. Race officials later decided to alter the course, staying on the Italian side of the Alps, believing the stretches that were to take place in France were too remote and that radio communication in the area could not be assured. The course as it originally was designed mimicked exactly a course used in the 1949 Giro d'Italia.

The race's overall contenders were expected to distinguish themselves on this stage.

Twelve eventually came ahead of the peloton, with seven in the lead and five chasing between the leaders and the peloton. The third group on the road eventually dwindled to a select contingent of overall favorites, which included race leader Danilo Di Luca. Former Giro champion Stefano Garzelli attacked from this group on the day's first climb and got to the leading group of five before the summit, claiming maximum points on it and on Sestrière to gain leadership of the mountains classification at the end of the day. Garzelli's maximum advantage, at the summit of Sestrière, was just over six minutes.

A group of most of the top riders in the GC, paced by the race leader himself, caught every one of the twelve initial leaders, and subsequently Garzelli just before the day's last climb, Prà Martino. Di Luca's aggressive descent of Prà Martino gave him a gap over the elite group of riders who had been able to hold his wheel to that point, and the stage win. The day saw a big winner in time gains and a big loser: Lance Armstrong finished 29 seconds behind Di Luca in the same group as the man finishing sixth on the stage, gaining seven places in the GC, while Thomas Lövkvist lost over a minute and fell from second to eighth in the GC.

Stage 11

20 May 2009 — Turin to Arenzano, 

The Passo del Turchino, famous for its use every year in the classic one-day race Milan–San Remo, was visited  from the end of this stage. The climb is not difficult enough to be at all selective, so pre-stage analysis led to expectations that either a mass sprint would occur or a breakaway of riders deep down in the GC would finish first on this stage.

Astana rider Chris Horner did not start the stage due to a leg injury sustained in a fall in Stage 10, leaving Levi Leipheimer and Lance Armstrong without their usual support rider. At the  mark, Caisse d'Epargne rider Joaquim Rodríguez dropped out after a 9th-place finish in the previous stage.

A break formed after , including Gustavo César, Cameron Meyer, Dmytro Grabovskyy and Alessandro Donati. Soon after, Levi Leipheimer crashed, but was unhurt. The break was caught, and a solo break was formed by Vladimir Isaichev. Astana drove the peloton up the Turchino, the day's lone climb, with Armstrong leading the descent and race leader Danilo Di Luca somewhat surprisingly coming forward to hold Armstrong's wheel. Some riders tried to escape for victory on the way into Arenzano, but the sprinters' teams worked to keep the field together, and Mark Cavendish took another bunched sprint win over Tyler Farrar and Alessandro Petacchi.

It was after this stage, on the eve of the Cinque Terre time trial, that Danilo Di Luca gave his first of two positive tests for continuous erythropoiesis receptor activator (CERA), the results of which became public after the Giro was over.

See also

References

2009 Giro d'Italia
Giro d'Italia stages